Augustan Age may refer to
 the period of Roman history when Augustus was the first emperor
 the period of Latin literature associated with the reign of Augustus: see Augustan literature (ancient Rome)
 the early 18th century in British culture, when writers and other intellectuals admired and emulated the original Augustan Age: see Augustan literature and Augustan poetry